Ivan Shafiq (Pashto: اون شفیق) is a Pakistani Pashto music composer, songwriter, music producer, musician, and philanthropist. Ivan Shafiq's works are noted for integrating Eastern classical music with electronic music, world music and traditional orchestral arrangements. With an in-house studio Ivan's film-scoring career began during the early 1990s. Working in Pashto film and Music industries, Ivan is one of the Pakistan's all-time best-selling recording artists. In a notable two-decade career, he has been acclaimed for redefining contemporary Pashto film music and contributing to the success of several films.

Songography 
Ivan Shafiq productions exceed 1000 audios and videos. The following is a list of top 100 songs.

References
List of Music produced by Ivan Shafiq

Ivan Shafiq's opinion on Pashto Music Industry

External links 
 All Compositions of Ivan Shafiq

Pakistani musicians
1975 births
Living people
Pakistani lyricists
Pashtun people